White Wings Hanau is a professional basketball club based in Hanau, Germany. The team currently plays in the ProB, the second highest professional division in Germany. The team plays its home games at the Main-Kinzig-Halle, which has a capacity of 1,564 people.

References

External links
Official website (in German)

Basketball teams in Germany